Paul Shattock  is a British autism researcher and scientific consultant to the charity Education and Services for People with Autism, of which he is also the founder. He was formerly the director of the Autism Research Unit at the University of Sunderland. He is well known for his disputed research into dietary therapy and autism, having claimed that autistic children may have a "leaky gut" which allows certain peptides to enter the bloodstream, and claimed that they excrete unusually high levels thereof. As a result of this speculation, he has promoted the use of a gluten-free, casein-free diet to ameliorate the symptoms of autism, a theory he developed along with Kalle Reichelt. In addition, he has claimed that a protein found in milk may play a role in the etiology of autism. He is also the former president of the World Autism Organization.

In 2002, Shattock conducted a survey and claimed that this survey had identified a unique subset of autistic children who may be uniquely susceptible to the MMR vaccine. These children were identified by the fact that they tended to suffer from bowel problems, had an abnormal gait and were friendlier than other autistic children. In addition, this survey concluded that one in ten parents of autistic children attributed their child's autism to this vaccine, and that these children had much higher levels of urinary indolyl-3-acryloylglycine. However, Shattock was criticized by Peter Dukes of the Medical Research Council, who noted that Shattock's findings had yet to be published in a peer-reviewed journal.

Personal life
Shattock has a son, Jamie, who was diagnosed with autism in 1975.

In 1980 Shattock helped raise £80,000 to pay for the North East Autism Society (NEAS) centre at Thornhill Park, when he was known as "the Birdman".

References

Academics of the University of Sunderland
Autism researchers
British pharmacologists
Living people
Officers of the Order of the British Empire
Year of birth missing (living people)